Sir Vincent Fean KCVO (born 20 November 1952) is a retired British diplomat and former Ambassador who is now Chairman of the Libyan British Business Council.

Early life
Thomas Vincent Fean was born in Burnley, Lancashire, England. He was educated at St Theodore's RC High School in Burnley and, from 1971 to 1975. at the University of Sheffield where he obtained a BA Honours degree in  French and German.

Diplomatic career
Fean joined the Diplomatic Service in 1975 and retired from it in 2014. His career included appointments as High Commissioner to Malta (2002–06), Ambassador to Libya (2006–10), and Consul General to Jerusalem (de facto ambassador to the Occupied Palestinian Territories) from 2010 to 2014.

Awards and honours
He was appointed Knight Commander of the Royal Victorian Order in 2005.

He is an Officer of the Order of St John.

In July 2010, he received an honorary degree from the University of Sheffield.

Controversy
Fean was Ambassador to Libya during the 2009 release of Pan Am Flight 103 bomber Abdelbaset al-Megrahi. In information released in the 2010 Wikileaks cables, he was attributed as saying that “they could have cut us off at the knees” in relation to likely Libyan government actions against UK interests in the country, should Megrahi die in prison in Scotland.

Views on recognition of Palestine
In December 2014 The New York Times published an opinion piece by Fean in which outlined what he believes are requirements for a peaceful solution to the Israeli-Palestinian conflict. He argues in the article that European countries such as Britain, Spain, France, Ireland as well as the European Parliament are working to promote coexistence between Israelis and Palestinians, and to that end are considering recognition of Palestine as "a contribution to a negotiated peace, not a substitute for it.

Personal life
He and his wife Anne have two daughters and one son.

He has been Chairman of the Libyan British Business Council since 2016.

References

External links
Vincent Fean's articles in The Guardian
Libyan British Business Council

1952 births
Living people
Alumni of the University of Sheffield
Ambassadors of the United Kingdom to Libya
Consuls-General of the United Kingdom to Jerusalem
High Commissioners of the United Kingdom to Malta
Knights Commander of the Royal Victorian Order
Officers of the Order of St John
People from Burnley